Lucas Debargue (born 23 October 1990) is a French pianist and composer. He was awarded fourth prize at the XV International Tchaikovsky Competition.

Early life and education 
Debargue was born in Paris, France, on 23 October 1990. Growing up in Compiègne, he took his first piano lessons there at the age of 10, with Christine Muenier.

He stopped his piano studies at 15, becoming more interested in literature.

At 17 he relocated to Paris to study for a degree in Arts and Literature at Paris Diderot University.

In 2010 he quit literature studies and returned to the keyboard. When meeting with teacher Rena Chereshevskaya, he decided to become a professional musician and prepare for competitions. He graduated under her direction in 2016, at the École Normale de Musique de Paris "Alfred Cortot".

Career 
In 2015 Debargue was awarded fourth prize at the XV International Tchaikovsky Competition and the Special Prize of the Moscow Music Critics Association for the musician "whose incredible gift, artistic vision and creative freedom have impressed the critics as well as the audience".

After the performance, Debargue was invited to play solo recitals, concerto engagements, and chamber music concerts at concert halls including the Great Hall of the Moscow Conservatory, the Tchaikovsky Concert Hall in Moscow, the Mariinsky Theatre Concert Hall, the St Petersburg Philharmonic Hall, the Theatre des Champs Elysées, the Salle Gaveau, the Milan Conservatory, Wigmore Hall and Royal Festival Hall in London, the Concertgebouw in Amsterdam, the Prinzregententheater in Munich, the Berlin Philharmonie, the Konserthuset in Stockholm, and Carnegie Hall in New York.

He has collaborated with conductors including Valery Gergiev, Andrey Boreyko, Mikhail Pletnev, Vladimir Spivakov, Yutaka Sado, Tugan Sokhiev and musicians such as Gidon Kremer, Janine Jansen and Martin Fröst.

Debargue records for Sony Classical and was awarded the ECHO Klassik prize in 2017.

In 2017 a documentary directed by Martin Mirabel (Bel Air productions), Lucas Debargue : To Music, was released and selected for the FIPA in Biarritz in 2018.

In 2019 Gidon Kremer named Debargue a "Kremerata Baltica permanent guest".

Compositions 

 Concertino, for piano, string orchestra and drums (2017), premiered by the author and Kremerata Baltica in Cesis (Latvia).
 Quatuor Symphonique, for piano quartet (2018), premiered in the Centre de Musique de Chambre de Paris with Eva Zavaro (violin), Adrien Boisseau (viola) and Jerome Pernoo (cello).
 Trio, for violin, cello and piano (2019), premiered in Théâtre des Champs-Elysées by the author and David Castro-Balbi (violin) Alexandre Castro-Balbi (cello).

Discography

Solo recordings

Chamber music

References 

1990 births
Living people
Musicians from Paris
Conservatoire de Paris alumni
21st-century French male classical pianists
Sony Classical Records artists